Thomas Inch (27 December 1881 – 12 December 1963) was a British strongman, who held the titles of Britain's Strongest Youth and Britain's Strong Man.

Early life 
Thomas Inch was born on 27 December 1881 in Scarborough, a seaside town on the North Yorkshire coast in the U.K. He became interested in bodybuilding and strength as a young boy, bodybuilding through manual labour.

Lifting career 
In 1902, aged 19, Inch was declared by a major 'strongman' publication as the "World’s Strongest Youth," enhancing his notoriety. His inspirations included Eugen Sandow, having seen the German ripping a pack of cards in half and throwing the split deck into the audience. Inch was said to have caught one half of the pack, proceeded to split that in half in the audience, and throw it back at Sandow.

Unlike many professional strongmen of his day, Inch focused on standard lifts with barbells and dumbbells and left the hoisting of wooden barrels, heavy sacks of grain, pianos, or holding back a team of horses, to his contemporaries. His one exception was that he sometimes lifted human beings in the bent-press; a complicated, one-hand movement to watch.

Book and capitalisation on fame 

Inch realized in order to advance his fame and fortune as a world class strongman, he needed to meet the prerequisite of publishing a well-written book pertaining to physical fitness. He accomplished this by publishing Scientific Weightlifting in 1905 and by authoring "Thomas Inch on Strength" in 1907. The following years, he traveled the British countryside performing exhibitions, selling his book, and spreading the Inch name. Inch had previously launched a mail order muscle course in 1903 which went on to sell over 40,000 copies.

Inch was responsible for establishing the first mail-order physical culture business in the UK.

Britain's Strongest Man and World Records 
Inch went on to win the title of Britain's Strongest Man on 11 June 1910. At the age of 68, Inch was still capable of deadlifting , an unofficial world record.

Thomas Inch dumbbell 
He is known for the "Thomas Inch" dumbbell, also known as "172", a dumbbell that weighs 172 lbs. 9 oz. (78.2730 kg). It was extremely difficult to lift, partly due to its weight, but primarily because its handle was very thick at 2 3/8" (6.03 cm) in diameter, making it difficult to hold on to without an outstandingly strong grip. There were allegations that there was a hole in the original 'bell, in which Thomas would place a nail, allowing him to arrest any rotation whilst lifting it. On 22 June 2002, Olympic weightlifter, champion powerlifter, and professional wrestler Mark Henry completed a successful one-hand clean and jerk of the dumbbell.

Inch claimed that in his lifetime he never encountered anyone who could lift the 172 from the floor to overhead using only one hand. Even further, he claimed that no one could clear it off the floor. During his lifetime, German strongman Arthur Saxon and fellow British bodybuilder Reg Park both tried and failed to lift it. He said he had overheaded it literally 'hundreds of times', sometimes lifting it twice in the same performance.

In 1909, Inch, still only a middleweight, refused to compete in a weightlifting match against the Austrian strongman Max Sick (Maxick), who had recently arrived in London. However, by 1910 Inch had become a heavyweight and so relinquished his middleweight title to Edward Aston, and a competition was quickly arranged against Sick.

Other ventures 
Inch occasionally served as a strength and conditioning trainer to professional boxers, and helped to rehabilitate wounded soldiers at Fulham Military Hospital following World War I.

Death 
Inch died in Cobham, Surrey on 12 December 1963 of coronary thrombosis (although some people used the diagnosis as an umbrella term for both the disease itself or a myocardial infarction which follows). His family did not keep any of his bodybuilding memorabilia following his death.

Selected publications

Inch on Fitness (1923)
Away with Nerves (1946)
Manual of Physical Training (1947)
Boxing for Beginners, from Novice to Champion (1951)

References 

1881 births
1963 deaths
English strength athletes
People associated with physical culture
Sportspeople from Scarborough, North Yorkshire
Strength training writers